Odostomia andamanensis is a species of sea snail, a marine gastropod mollusc in the family Pyramidellidae, the pyrams and their allies.

Description
The length of the shell attains 6.75 mm, its diameter 1.75 mm.

(Original description) The subulate shell is greyish white, painted with an indistinct whitish, infra-sutural, spiral band, semi-transparent. The 10 whorls are marked with transverse lines of growth. The sutures are impressed. The aperture is elongately oval. The columella is posteriorly plicate.

Distribution
This marine species occurs off the Andaman & Nicobar Islands

References

External links

andamanensis
Gastropods described in 1908